Crashout is a 1955 American film noir crime film directed by Lewis R. Foster and starring William Bendix, Arthur Kennedy, Luther Adler, William Talman, Gene Evans, Marshall Thompson, and Beverly Michaels.

Plot
Convict Van Duff is the leader of a large-scale prison break. The breakout works as the six survivors hide out in a forgotten mine working near the prison.

Once the coast is clear they then set out on a long, dangerous journey. The convicts take by foot, car, train and truck in an attempt to get to some hidden stolen bank loot. On the journey, the doomed prisoners meet with some locals including a farm woman (Beverly Michaels), a kidnapped doctor (Percy Helton) and a young woman on a train (Gloria Talbott).

Cast
 William Bendix as Van Morgan Duff
 Arthur Kennedy as Joe Quinn
 Luther Adler as Pete Mendoza
 William Talman as Luther Remsen
 Gene Evans as Maynard "Monk" Collins
 Marshall Thompson as Billy Lang
 Beverly Michaels as Alice Mosher
 Gloria Talbott as Girl in Train
 Adam Williams as Fred Summerfield
 Percy Helton as Doctor Louis Barnes
 Melinda Markey as Girl in Bar
 Christopher Olsen as Timmy Mosher (as Chris Olsen)
 Adele St. Mauer as Mrs. Mosher
 Edward Clark as Conductor
 Tom Dugan as Ed, the Bartender

See also
List of American films of 1955

References

External links
 
 
 
 Crashout informational site and DVD review at DVD Beaver (includes images)
 

1955 films
1955 crime drama films
Film noir
Films directed by Lewis R. Foster
Films scored by Leith Stevens
American crime drama films
American prison drama films
1950s English-language films
1950s American films
American black-and-white films